Many placenames of English origin end with the element -ington. 
Often following the name of a person, -ing means "folk of" or "clan of", and -ton suggests a village. 

In return, many of these placenames later became surnames.
A number of fictional places and characters were also named on this model.

Real names
Addington
Arlington

Barrington
Boyington

Burlington

Carrington
Covington
Cunnington
Darrington
Durrington

Earlington
Ellington

Farrington
Fordington

Garlington
Girlington

Harrington
Huntington

Irvington
Islington

Julington

Kellington
Kensington

Lexington
Luddington

Millington
Mornington

Newington
Norrington

Oakington
Orpington
Overington

Paddington
Pilkington

Quarrington

Remington
Rowington

Sevington
Stonington

Torrington
Turlington

Uppington

Washington, County Durham
Washington, District of Columbia
Weddington
Wellington

Yelvington
Yetlington

Fictional names
Bluffington, hometown of Doug
Chuggington
Crushington Park, main setting of Bigfoot Presents: Meteor and the Mighty Monster Trucks
Walmington-on-Sea, setting of Dad's Army

References

English toponyms
English suffixes
Place name element etymologies
Surname